Rebecca Newberger Goldstein (born February 23, 1950) is an American philosopher, novelist, and public intellectual. She has written ten books, both fiction and non-fiction. She holds a Ph.D. in philosophy of science from Princeton University, and is sometimes grouped with novelists such as Richard Powers and Alan Lightman, who create fiction that is knowledgeable of, and sympathetic toward, science.

In her three non-fiction works, she has shown an affinity for philosophical rationalism, as well as a conviction that philosophy, like science, makes progress, and that scientific progress is itself supported by philosophical arguments. She has also stressed the role that secular philosophical reason has made in moral advances.

Increasingly, in her talks and interviews, she has been exploring what she has called "mattering theory" as an alternative to traditional utilitarianism. This theory is a continuation of her idea of "the mattering map", first suggested in her novel The Mind–Body Problem. The concept of the mattering map has been widely adopted in contexts as diverse as cultural criticism, psychology, and behavioral economics.

Goldstein is a MacArthur Fellow, and has received the National Humanities Medal, the National Jewish Book Award, and numerous other honors.

Early life and education
Goldstein, born Rebecca Newberger, grew up in White Plains, New York. She was born into an Orthodox Jewish family. She has one older brother, who is an Orthodox rabbi, and a younger sister, Sarah Stern. An older sister, Mynda Barenholtz, died in 2001. She did her undergraduate work at City College of New York, UCLA, and Barnard College, where she graduated as valedictorian in 1972. After earning her Ph.D. in philosophy from Princeton University, where she studied with Thomas Nagel and wrote a dissertation titled "Reduction, Realism, and the Mind", she returned to Barnard as a professor of philosophy.

Career
In 1983, Goldstein published her first novel, The Mind-Body Problem, a serio-comic tale of the conflict between emotion and intelligence, combined with reflections on the nature of mathematical genius, the challenges faced by intellectual women, and Jewish tradition and identity. Goldstein said she wrote the book to "insert 'real life' intimately into the intellectual struggle. In short, I wanted to write a philosophically motivated novel."

Her second novel, The Late-Summer Passion of a Woman of Mind (1989), was also set in academia, though with a far darker tone. Her third novel, The Dark Sister (1993), was something of a departure: a postmodern fictionalization of family and professional issues in the life of William James. She followed it with a short-story collection, Strange Attractors (1993), which was a National Jewish Honor Book and New York Times Notable Book of the Year. A fictional mother, daughter, and granddaughter introduced in two of the stories in that collection became the main characters of Goldstein's next novel, Mazel (1995), which won the National Jewish Book Award and the 1995 Edward Lewis Wallant Award.

A MacArthur Fellowship in 1996 led to the writing of Properties of Light (2000), a ghost story about love, betrayal, and quantum physics. Her most recent novel is 36 Arguments for the Existence of God: A Work of Fiction (2010), which explores ongoing controversies over religion and reason through the tale of a professor of psychology who has written an atheist best-seller, while his life is permeated with secular versions of religious themes such as messianism, divine genius, and the quest for immortality. The book has a long non-fiction appendix (attributed to the novel's protagonist) that details 36 traditional and modern arguments for the existence of God, together with their claimed refutations. National Public Radio chose it as one of its "five favorite books of 2010", and The Christian Science Monitor named it the best book of fiction of 2010.

Goldstein has written two biographical studies: Incompleteness: The Proof and Paradox of Kurt Gödel (2005); and Betraying Spinoza: The Renegade Jew Who Gave Us Modernity (2006). Betraying Spinoza combined her continuing interest in Jewish ideas, history, and identity with an increasing focus on secularism, humanism, and atheism. Goldstein has described the book, which combines elements of memoir, biography, history, and philosophical analysis, as "the eighth book I'd published, but [the] first in which I took the long-delayed and irrevocable step of integrating my private and public selves". Together with 36 Arguments for the Existence of God: A Work of Fiction, it established her as a prominent figure in the humanist movement, part of a wave of "new new atheists" marked by less divisive rhetoric and a greater representation of women. In 2011, she was named "Humanist of the Year" by the American Humanist Association, and "Freethought Heroine" by the Freedom from Religion Foundation.

In 2014, she published Plato at the Googleplex: Why Philosophy Won't Go Away, an exploration of the historical roots and contemporary relevance of philosophy. The book alternates between expository chapters on the life and ideas of Plato in the context of ancient Greece and modern dialogues in which Plato is brought to life in the 21st century, and demonstrates the relevance of philosophy by arguing with contemporary figures such as a software engineer at Google headquarters, a right-wing talk show host, an affective neuroscientist, and others.

In addition to Barnard, Goldstein has taught at Columbia, Rutgers, and Trinity College in Hartford, Connecticut, and since 2014, she has been a visiting professor at the New College of the Humanities in London. In 2016, she was a visiting professor in the English department at New York University. She has held visiting fellowships at the Radcliffe Institute,  Brandeis University, the Santa Fe Institute, Yale University, and Dartmouth College. In 2011, she delivered the Tanner Lectures on Human Values at Yale University, "The Ancient Quarrel: Philosophy and Literature". She serves on the Council on Values of the World Economic Forum, and on the advisory board of the Secular Coalition for America.

Goldstein's writing has also appeared in chapters in a number of edited books, in journals including The Atlantic, The Chronicle of Higher Education, The New York Times Book Review, The New York Review of Books, The New Republic, The Wall Street Journal, Huffington Post, Tikkun, Commentary, and in blog format in The Washington Post's "On Faith" section.

Personal life
Goldstein married her first husband, physicist Sheldon Goldstein, in 1969, and they divorced in 1999. They are the parents of the novelist Yael Goldstein Love and poet Danielle Blau. In a 2006 interview with Luke Ford, Goldstein said:

In 2007, she married cognitive psychologist Steven Pinker.

Awards and fellowships
 2014 National Humanities Medal (presented September 10, 2015, at the White House by President Barack Obama) 
 2014 Richard Dawkins Award
 2013 Montgomery Fellow, Dartmouth College
 2013 Moment Magazine Creativity Award
 2012 Franke Visiting Fellow, Whitney Humanities Center, Yale University
 2011 Humanist of the Year awarded April 2011 by the American Humanist Association
 2011 Freethought Heroine awarded October 2011 by the Freedom from Religion Foundation
 2011 Miller Scholar, Santa Fe Institute
 Best Fiction Book of 2010 ("36 Arguments for the Existence of God: A Work of Fiction"), Christian Science Monitor
 Honorary Doctorate, Emerson College, 2008
 Humanist Laureate, awarded by the International Academy of Humanism, 2008
 Fellow, Radcliffe Institute for Advanced Study at Harvard University, 2006–2007
 Guggenheim Fellow, 2006–2007
 Koret Jewish Book Award in Jewish Thought, 2006, for Betraying Spinoza: The Renegade Jew who Gave Us Modernity
 Fellow of the American Academy of Arts and Sciences, 2005
 Honorary Doctorate, Spertus Institute for Jewish Learning and Leadership
 MacArthur Fellow, 1996
 National Jewish Book Award, 1995, for Mazel
 Edward Lewis Wallant Award, 1995, for Mazel
 National Jewish Book Award for her book of short stories, Strange Attractors
 Graduated summa cum laude from Barnard College, receiving the Montague Prize for Excellence in Philosophy
 While at Princeton University, she was awarded a National Science Foundation Fellowship
 Whiting Award, 1991

Bibliography

Fiction
Thirty-Six Arguments for the Existence of God: A Work of Fiction (2010)
Properties of Light: A Novel of Love, Betrayal, and Quantum Physics (2000)
Mazel (1995)
The Dark Sister (1993)
The Late-Summer Passion of a Woman of Mind (1989)
The Mind-Body Problem (1983)

Short stories
Strange Attractors: Stories (1993)

Nonfiction
Plato at the Googleplex: Why Philosophy Won't Go Away (2014)
Betraying Spinoza: The Renegade Jew Who Gave Us Modernity (2006)
Incompleteness: The Proof and Paradox of Kurt Gödel (2005)

See also
American philosophy
List of American philosophers
List of novelists from the United States
Philosophical fiction

References

External links

1950 births
Living people
20th-century American novelists
21st-century American novelists
21st-century American philosophers
Jewish American atheists
American humanists
American women short story writers
American short story writers
Barnard College alumni
Barnard College faculty
Trinity College (Connecticut) faculty
Brandeis University faculty
Columbia University faculty
Fellows of the American Academy of Arts and Sciences
Jewish American novelists
Jewish philosophers
MacArthur Fellows
New Atheism
People from Truro, Massachusetts
People from White Plains, New York
Princeton University alumni
Rutgers University faculty
American scholars of ancient Greek philosophy
Women classical scholars
American women philosophers
Writers from Boston
Novelists from New York (state)
American women essayists
American women novelists
21st-century American women writers
21st-century American biographers
American women biographers
National Humanities Medal recipients
Spinoza scholars
Novelists from New Jersey
Novelists from Massachusetts
Novelists from Connecticut
21st-century American essayists